Moroka Swallows Football Club (often known as simply Swallows or The Birds) is a South African professional football club based in Soweto in the city of Johannesburg in the Gauteng province.

Founded in 1947, Swallows are one of the original two Soweto clubs, together with Orlando Pirates, thus contest what is known as the Original Soweto Derby.

Until relegation in the 2014–15 season, the club had played every season of the Premier Soccer League.

They won the 2019–20 National First Division and competed in the 2020–21 South African Premier Division, they finished 6th in what was their first season back in top-flight football league system and qualified for 2021 MTN 8 Cup competition. They play their home matches at Dobsonville Stadium.

History
The club was founded in the 1940s by a trio of soccer lovers, Ishmael Lesolang, Strike Makgatha, and Johnny Kubheka.

They originally named the side Congregated Rovers after the firm in which most of the players and officials worked, later changing it to Moroka Rovers.

But then, on 10 October 1947, the trio decided to change the name again to Moroka Swallows, basing themselves in the township formally known as Masakeng.

The name has lasted for the best part of 55 years, a period which has seen consistent success both on the field and off it.

The name 'moroka' means 'rain maker' in Setswana and the township was probably named after Chief Moroka of Barolong boo-Seleka who became the president of the African National Congress in 1940s. It is hardly surprising therefore that the club was renamed the 'rain bird'.

The 1950s and 1960s were a successful time for the club, culminating in their greatest ever achievement, winning the South African League title in 1965.

Off the field, the club was becoming a business and in 1971 they became the first ever football team to register as a public company.

That same year they were also the first to receive an official sponsorship when Teljoy began their association with the club.

The decade between 1982 and 1992 was a successful one for the team, culminating in four pieces of silverware.

In 2007, the club celebrated its 60th anniversary. Two years later Swallows won the Nedbank Cup, the club's first piece of silverware for five years.

The club narrowly avoided relegation in the 2013–14 season, finishing thirteenth. The 2014–15 season saw them relegated for the first time in their history, finishing 15th, and failing to retain their position after being defeated in the promotion-relegation playoffs.

Following their first relegation from the top level, the club finished bottom of the log in the National First Division, and were relegated again to the SAFA Second Division.

Prior to the start of the 2018–19 season, Swallows purchased the franchise of National First Division team Maccabi for R8 million, and competed in the 2019–20 National First Division.

At the end 2019–20 National First Division season, the club gained promotion to the Premier Soccer League following a 3–0 win against third-placed Tshakhuma Tsha Madzivhandila F.C., and will compete in the 2020–21 South African Premier Division.

Honours
South African Soccer League
Winners: 1965
Mainstay Cup
Winners: 1983
Bob Save Super Bowl
Winners: 1989, 1991
BP Top Eight Cup
Winners: 1975, 1979
Sales House Cup
Winners: 1978
ABSA Cup
Winners: 2004
Nedbank Cup
Winners: 2009
 MTN 8
 Winners: 2012
 National First Division
Winners: 2019–20

Club records
Most starts:  Andries Mpondo 395
Most goals:  Thomas Hlongwane 73
Most capped player:  Lerato Chabangu 13
Most starts in a season:  Andries Mpondo 49 (1986)
Most goals in a season:  Thomas Hlongwane 27 (1985)
Record Victory: 8–0 vs African Wanderers (29 September 1991, NSL)
Record Defeat: 2–6 vs Hellenic (7/3/85, Sales House Cup); Rangers (3/7/87, NSL)
Source:

Premier Soccer League record

2020/2021 – 6th
2014/2015 – 15th
2013/2014 – 13th
2012/2013 – 9th
2011/2012 – 2nd
2010/2011 – 13th
2009/2010 – 8th
2008/2009 – 11th
2007/2008 – 7th
2006/2007 – 3rd
2005/2006 – 4th
2004/2005 – 5th

2003/2004 – 7th
2002/2003 – 4th
2001/2002 – 6th
2000/2001 – 15th
1999/2000 – 12th
1998/1999 – 15th
1997/1998 – 11th
1996/1997 – 11th

Club officials/Technical team
MD & Chairman:  David Mogashoa
CEO:  Sipho Xulu
Head Coach:  Ernst Middendorp

First team squad
Updated 13 August, 2022

Notable players
  Brad Norman (2019): He converted into the first South African to play in Paraguay following his stint with Moroka Swallows.

Notable former coaches

  Walter Rautmann
  Eddie Lewis (1989–91)
  Sandile Bali (1991–92)
  Milo Bjelica (1992)
  Mich d'Avray (1992–93)
  Walter da Silva (1999)
  Viktor Bondarenko (2000–02)
  Gavin Hunt (1 July 2002 – 30 June 2007)
  Ian Gorowa (1 July 2007 – 30 June 2008)
  Júlio César Leal (1 July 2008 – 30 June 2009)
  Rainer Zobel (17 July 2009 – 28 Nov 2010)
  Gordon Igesund (29 Nov 2010 – 30 June 2012)
  Zeca Marques (1 July 2012 – 2014)
  Craig Rosslee (March 2015–)

References

External links
 
Premier Soccer League
PSL Club Info
South African Football Association
Confederation of African Football

 
Association football clubs established in 1947
Soweto
Premier Soccer League clubs
National First Division clubs
Soccer clubs in Johannesburg
Sport in Germiston
1947 establishments in South Africa